Gjøvik Stadion is a multi-purpose stadium located in Gjøvik, Norway.

The municipal complex is the home venue of football club FK Gjøvik-Lyn. The stadium opened in 1910. The venue hosted one match in the 1963–64 European Cup Winners' Cup, where Gjøvik/Lyn played APOEL F.C.

It was used as a speed skating venue until 1994, when it received all-weather running track. The venue hosted the Norwegian Athletics Championships in 1964.

References

External links
 Gjøvik Stadion - Nordic Stadiums

Football venues in Norway
Eliteserien venues
Athletics (track and field) venues in Norway
Speed skating venues in Norway
1910 establishments in Norway
Event venues established in 1910
Sports venues in Gjøvik